Janjar is a village in the commune of Markat, part of municipality of Konispol, Albania. The village is inhabited by Albanians. As of 1995, it had 595 inhabitants. Ethnographically, this settlement belongs to the region of Çamëria.

Geography
From the North-West the village borders with Ninat, from the South with Koska, and Plesavitsa; from the West with Vërva and Dishati, and from the East with Pallamba. Janjar is composed of the following neighbourhoods: Bratat, Brahimat, Fshat i Math and Klisha.

References

External links
 Sarandë/ Janjari, fshati në kufi me Greqinë, Banorët: Jemi të izoluar, s’kemi rrugë dhe as ujë

Administrative units of Konispol
Former municipalities in Vlorë County
Villages in Vlorë County